Union Township is a township in Davis County, Iowa, USA.  As of the 2000 census, its population was 305.

History
Union Township was organized in 1846.

Geography
Union Township covers an area of 36.56 square miles (94.69 square kilometers); of this, 0.04 square miles (0.09 square kilometers) or 0.1 percent is water. The streams of Burr Oak Creek, Hickory Creek, Locke Branch and South Chequest Creek run through this township.

Unincorporated towns
 Dover (historical)
 Troy
(This list is based on USGS data and may include former settlements.)

Adjacent townships
 Salt Creek Township (north)
 Village Township, Van Buren County (northeast)
 Chequest Township, Van Buren County (east)
 Jackson Township, Van Buren County (southeast)
 Prairie Township (south)
 Cleveland Township (west)
 Perry Township (west)
 Lick Creek Township (northwest)

Cemeteries
The township contains seven cemeteries: Arney, Clark, Cupp Grave, Fountain, Richardson, Rouch and Troy.

Airports and landing strips 
 Hooper Field

References
 U.S. Board on Geographic Names (GNIS)
 United States Census Bureau cartographic boundary files

External links
 US-Counties.com
 City-Data.com

Townships in Davis County, Iowa
Townships in Iowa